Goshen Carnegie Public Library, also known as the Goshen Public Library, is a historic Carnegie library located at Goshen, Elkhart County, Indiana.  It was built in 1901, and is a -story, Beaux-Arts style building clad in Bedford limestone.  It has a red tile roof and projecting entrance pavilion with two Tuscan order columns.  Its construction was funded with $25,000 provided by the Carnegie Foundation.  

It was added to the National Register of Historic Places in 1983.

The building today houses the Goshen City Hall. The current Goshen Public Library is located at 601 South 5th Street.

Appearance
The exterior is unchanged from its original design. It is one and a half stories from street levelt to the eave of the red tile roof.  Details from the Ecole des Beaux Arts and clad with Bedford limestone. The front (west) façade features an entrance pavilion. The double door is framed by two Tuscan Order columns with a stained glass transom.  The pavilion is capped with a parapet inscribed, '"Goshen Public Library A.D. 1901"'. A stone sphere rests atop each end of the parapet.
To the left and right of the entrance are two large, arched windows.

You enter into a marble vestibule with a bronze plaque of the original Library Board and Andrew Carnegie. Stairs to the right lead to the basement. Ahead are through the doors is the rotunda or charging room. This room is extensively decorated room. It has terrazzo floors, marble baseboards, and mahogany cabinets with marble counters. The original curved librarian's desk of marble and mahogany has been retained. The dome is painted with floral designs and includes the classical authors. Corinthian columns and pilasters surround the rotunda. The gilding and color scheme of greens and yellows have been restored to the building.

Bibliography
Goshen Daily News Times, various issues, 1901 through 1903
Carnegie Libraries, George S. Bobinski, ALA, 1969

See also
List of Carnegie libraries in Indiana

References

Carnegie libraries in Indiana
Libraries on the National Register of Historic Places in Indiana
Beaux-Arts architecture in Indiana
Library buildings completed in 1901
Buildings and structures in Elkhart County, Indiana
National Register of Historic Places in Elkhart County, Indiana
1901 establishments in Indiana